Ankit Mukherjee (born 10 July 1996) is an Indian professional footballer who plays as a defender for East Bengal in the Indian Super League.

Career
Born in Kolkata, West Bengal, Mukherjee started his football career with Army Public School, Calcutta. In 2013, Mukherjee represented the school's football side in the Keventer Cup. He played the tournament at center back and impressed enough to earn a spot in the tournament's All Star side. In 2014, during a friendly match against East Bengal U19, Mukherjee impressed East Bengal's coach and was selected to join the squad.

Mukherjee spent a year and a half with East Bengal before signing with Calcutta Premier Division side Aryan. After sporadic appearances in his first season, he soon broke into a regular starting role during his second year. Mukherjee's performances with Aryan earned him a selection into West Bengal's squad for the Santosh Trophy in 2017 and 2018. His performances for West Bengal's winning squad in 2017 earned him a deal with Mohammedan. With Mohammedan, Mukherjee played for the club in the Calcutta Premier Division and I-League 2nd Division.

ATK
On 9 August 2018, it was announced that Mukherjee, along with seven other Bengali players, had signed with Indian Super League side ATK. He made his professional debut for the club on 10 November 2018 against Pune City. He came on as a 74th-minute substitute for Aiborlang Khongjee as ATK won 1–0. Mukherjee then earned his first start during ATK's next game against Mumbai City on 24 November. The match ended in a 0–0 draw.

East Bengal
On 2 January 2021, it was announced that Ankit has signed for Kolkata giants East Bengal with a free transfer from ATK Mohun Bagan. On 3 January, he made his debut for East Bengal as he came on in as a substitute in the 73rd minute for Raju Gaikwad as the team won 3–1.

Personal life 
Mukherjee has a brother, Aniket Mukherjee. He was born to Raju Mukherjee and Mithu Mukherjee.

Career statistics

References

External links 
 Indian Super League Profile

1996 births
Living people
People from West Bengal
Indian footballers
Mohammedan SC (Kolkata) players
ATK (football club) players
Association football defenders
Footballers from West Bengal
Calcutta Football League players
I-League 2nd Division players
Indian Super League players
East Bengal Club players
ATK Mohun Bagan FC players
Aryan FC players